Omosita is a genus of sap beetles, erected by Wilhelm Ferdinand Erichson in 1843.

Species
These five species belong to the genus Omosita:
 Omosita colon (Linnaeus, 1758) i c g b
 Omosita depressa (Linnaeus, 1758) g
 Omosita discoidea (Fabricius, 1775) i c g b
 Omosita funesta Reitter, 1873 g
 Omosita nearctica Kirejtshuk, 1987 g b
Data sources: i = ITIS, c = Catalogue of Life, g = GBIF, b = Bugguide.net

References

Nitidulidae
Beetles described in 1843